Vasil Dragolov (born 17 March 1962) is a former Bulgarian footballer, who played as a forward.

For the  Bulgarian national team, he amassed 5 appearances, netting 1 goal.

Honours
 Beroe
A PFG Winner: 1985-86

External links

 Profile at LevskiSofia.info

1962 births
Living people
Bulgarian footballers
Association football forwards
First Professional Football League (Bulgaria) players
FC Hebar Pazardzhik players
PFC Beroe Stara Zagora players
PFC Levski Sofia players
PFC Cherno More Varna players
Athlitiki Enosi Larissa F.C. players
Ionikos F.C. players
Bulgaria international footballers
1986 FIFA World Cup players
Bulgarian expatriate footballers
Expatriate footballers in Greece
Bulgarian expatriate sportspeople in Greece
Expatriate footballers in Portugal
Bulgarian expatriate sportspeople in Portugal